Sree Kerala Varma College is a government aided college in Kanattukara, Thrissur, Kerala, India. Founded in 1947 by His Highness Aikya Keralam Thampuran, the Maharaja of erstwhile Kingdom of Cochin. Managed by the Cochin Devaswom Board, Sree Kerala Varma College (affiliated to the University of Calicut) is an academic institution in Kerala. Located in a vast lush green campus, only 3 kilometers away from the heart of Thrissur, the cultural capital of Kerala. 

Sree Kerala Varma College is a semi residential college. Blessed with rich flora and fauna, this campus offers the seekers of knowledge 8 Post Graduate and 16 Under Graduate programmes besides hosting 3 Research Centres (Malayalam, English and Political Science). An excellent academic team from various facilities (including 40 Ph.D. & 25 M.Phil. degree holders) heads the academic activities. Fully equipped with amenities like centralized library, science and language laboratories, hostels for boys and girls, SKVC also is vibrant with a creative and socially committed campus having National Cadet Corps (India), N.S.S., Nature Club, Film Club, Drama Club, Fine Arts Club.

History
The idea of starting a new college at Trichur city originated from a committee of prominent citizens of Trichur, including Cheloor mana Itti Ravi Namboodiri who was a member of the first Legislative Assembly of Kingdom of Cochin in 1925 in response to strong public demand. The members of the committee approached His Highness Aikya Keralam Thampuran, the then Maharajah of Kochi who allowed free use of the Merry Lodge Palace and the naming of the college after His Highness, Sree Kerala Varma College.

A grant of one lakh rupees and a loan of four lakhs towards capital expenditure and a free grant of two hundred and fifty candies of timber were sanctioned by His Highness. The college was initially under the University of Calicut.

Academics
This prestigious institution which is the alma mater of multitudes who have made their mark in various fields, was awarded the highest grade A by the National Assessment & Accreditation Council in 2009 for its meritorious performances and contributions.
Sree Kerala Varma College holds rich tradition extending beyond seventy years in the higher education scenario of Kerala. This college has acclaimed fame among the colleges of the affiliating Calicut University for its splendid performance on varied fronts like diversity of its teaching departments and the excellence in academics.

The contributions of Sree Kerala Varma College in Arts, Science, Languages, Humanities and Commerce are invaluable.

Departments
 Botany (UG)
 Chemistry (UG, PG)
 Computer Applications (UG)
 Commerce (UG, PG)
 Economics (UG, PG)
 English (UG, PG, Research)
 Hindi (UG)
 History (UG)
 Malayalam (UG, PG, Research)
 Mathematics (UG, PG)
 Philosophy (UG)
 Physical Education 
 Physics (UG, PG, Research)
 Political Science (UG, PG, Research)
 Sanskrit (UG,PG)
 Statistics (UG)
 Zoology (UG,PG)

Facilities

Library
The College Library is a spacious two storey building, housed next to the Administrative Block. The library has over 70,000 books, subscriptions to both online and print periodicals and magazines, back volumes, and access to INFLIBNET and NLIST. The library caters to the staff, students and research scholars affiliated to different departments. The library is equipped with OPAC facility. Reprography services are provided in the Co-Operative store adjacent to the library building.

Hostel
The college provides hostel facilities for boys and girls subject to availability. The women's hostel is situated within the college campus and men's hostel is in a short distance from the college campus near the NDS stadium complex of the college. Women's hostel provides accommodation for nearly 220 students and men's hostel for nearly 120 students.

Sports
The Prof. N D Subramaniam Stadium of the college has facilities for playing various games like cricket, basketball, and football. The very sporting achievements of the college have their beginning in training facilities available in this stadium.
Gymnasium
The college Gymnasium is housed in the Main Block.

Student life
Students can take part in a range of activities from sports (football, cricket, basketball, handball, kabbadi, swimming, boxing, etc.).
National Cadet Corps, National Service Scheme, Nature Club, Film Club.

Festivals
All major festivals of Kerala are celebrated in the college with great enthusiasm.
 College day is usually celebrated during the last days of the academic year

Notable alumni
 K. Radhakrishnan
 V. S. Sunil Kumar
 C. N. Jayadevan
 Akbar Kakkattil
 N. N. Kakkad
 M. K. Ramachandran
 Cheril Krishna Menon
 T. S. Kalyanaraman
 P. N. C. Menon
 Meenakshi Thampan
 Rajaji Mathew Thomas
 K. Rajan
 V. R. Sunil Kumar
P. Balachandran
Murali Perunelli
 John Brittas
 Jo Paul Ancheri
 Pappachen Pradeep
 C. V. Pappachan
 Shaiju Mon
 Sreekumar Nair
 R. Bindu
 E. Santhosh Kumar
 Therambil Ramakrishnan
 P. Sankaran
 Urmila Unni
 Samyuktha Varma
 Narain
 Sunil Sukhada
 M. R. Chandrasekharan
 N. R. Anilkumar, international chess player
 K. K. Hiranyan
 Maythil Radhakrishnan
 Murali Perunelly
 K. P. Viswanathan
 Jithin M S, Indian footballer
 K. Rekha

Notable faculties
 R. Bindu, Minister for Health and Social Justice, Government of Kerala
 C. R. Rajagopalan, folklore researcher and writer.

See also
 St. Thomas College, Thrissur
 Government Law College, Thrissur
 Sri C. Achutha Menon Government College, Thrissur
 Government Engineering College, Thrissur
 Sree Krishna College, Guruvayur

References

Arts and Science colleges in Kerala
Colleges in Thrissur
Colleges affiliated with the University of Calicut
Educational institutions established in 1947
1947 establishments in India
Academic institutions formerly affiliated with the University of Madras